The Annals of Tourism Research is a bimonthly peer-reviewed academic journal covering research on the academic aspects of tourism. According to the Journal Citation Reports, the journal has a 2020 impact factor of 9.011.

History
The journal was established in 1973 with Jafar Jafari as the founding editor-in-chief.

References

External links

Publications established in 1973
English-language journals
Elsevier academic journals
Tourism journals
Bimonthly journals